Ole Andreas Øverland (17 March 1855 – 20 June 1911) was a Norwegian historian, writer and illustrator. He was characterized by Terje Bratberg as "one of the most prolific historians Norway has produced". He is best known for writing and illustrating two editions of a history of Norway; Illustreret Norges Historie (published by Folkebladet, Kristiania)

Biography
Øverland was born in Trondhjem (now Trondheim), Norway. He was the son of Ole Andreas Øverland (1819-1871) and his wife Gjertine Birgitte Moe (1818-1881). He graduated from Trondheim Cathedral School in 1873. Two years later he was awarded his philosophicum. He worked for a few years as a teacher before moving to Christiania (now Oslo) in 1878.  He  worked at the National Archives of Norway  (Riksarkivet)  until 1885.  In 1880 he was awarded a  Peter Andreas Munch scholarship (P. A. Munchs legat).

He then began writing what would become the first edition of his Illustreret Norges Historie, which was published in five volumes from 1885 to 1895. He was at the same time developing a 12-volume edition of the work, finishing in 1898.  In between working on this major work which received funding from Stortinget, he also wrote a number of other, smaller studies, biographies, and reviews. He produced a variety of historical works and published several textbooks. He was made a Government scholar (statsstipendiat) in 1898.

Selected works
 Huset Bernadotte, 1882
 Professor Dr. Ludvig Daae. En biografisk Skisse, 1884
 Lærebog i Norges nyeste historie, 1886 
 Fra en svunden tid. Sagn og optegnelser, 1888
 Vikingtog og Vinlandsfærder, 1896
 Af Sagnet og Historien, 1897
 Borgerne paa Fredrikshald. Skildringer fra krigen aar 1716, 1897
 Korstogenes Historie, 1900
 Oberst Hans Helgesen, 1903
 Thraniterbevægelsen, 1903
 Da vort kongepar kom. Mindeblad fra Norges nyeste historie, 1906
 Det gamle Norge i billeder og tekst, 1910

Gallery of illustration

References

External links
Illustreret Norges Historie

1855 births
1911 deaths
Writers from Trondheim
People educated at the Trondheim Cathedral School
Norwegian archivists
20th-century Norwegian historians
Norwegian government scholars
Burials at Vestre gravlund
19th-century Norwegian historians